Travis VaShon Brown (born July 26, 1986) is a former American football wide receiver. He was signed by the Seattle Seahawks as an undrafted free agent in 2008. He played college football at New Mexico.

Brown has also been a member of the Cincinnati Bengals, Chicago Bears and St. Louis Rams.

Early years
Brown was a 2004 graduate of Los Altos High School. He led his team to consecutive CIF Southern Section titles with him team going 14–0 in 2003 and 13–1 in 2002. Brown was First-team All-Conference as a senior when he caught 38 passes for 680 yards and 7 touchdowns. He also ran track with personal bests of 10.6 (100 meters), 21.7 (200) and 48.0 (400). He was also a three-year letterman in basketball and an honor roll student all four years with a 3.2 cumulative GPA.

College career
Brown was a three-year starter at UNM and earned First-team All-MWC honors as a junior and senior. He finished his career with a reception in 37 consecutive games. As a senior, he had a career-high 76 catches and 1,031 receiving yards for a 13.6 yards per catch and a career-high 6 touchdown catches. In 2006, he earned First-team All-MWC honors after totaling 64 catches and 867 yards (13.5 avg.), career-high 4 touchdown catches. The previous season he started 10 of 11 games and had 35 receptions for 245 yards (7.0 avg.), including a long of 34 and 2 touchdowns. As a true freshman he played in 9 games, with 2 starts and made 7 catches for 49 yards (7.0 avg.).

Professional career

Pre-draft measurables

St. Louis Rams
Brown re-signed with the St. Louis Rams on February 17, 2010. He was waived on May 4, 2010.

Brown married Courtnie Burnett on June 15, 2018. They have two children together.

External links
Chicago Bears bio
New Mexico Lobos bio

1986 births
Living people
Players of American football from Memphis, Tennessee
American football wide receivers
New Mexico Lobos football players
Seattle Seahawks players
Cincinnati Bengals players
Chicago Bears players
St. Louis Rams players